Straldzha is a small town in Yambol Province, Southeastern Bulgaria. It is the administrative centre of the homonymous Straldzha Municipality. As of December 2016, the town has a population of 6,326 inhabitants. 

The municipality of Straldzha is home to 12,014 people at the end of 2016: 6,326 of whom live in the city of Straldzha and 5,688 in the villages. It has a relatively high crude birth rate of 13,8‰ and a very high fertility rate of 3,01 children per woman, nearly two times higher than the national rate of 1,54 children per woman (at the end of 2016). The reason for this high fertility rate is the large concentration of ethnic Roma people in the municipality of Straldzha (nearly one-fifth of the population belong to the Romani community, which is exceeding four times the national average).

The small town is a hub for agriculture and wine production. Many residents however go to work and study in bigger cities , or abroad , due to the lack of opportunities and the toxicity that small towns like these bring. 

During the communism era , Straldzha was a growing town with many factories and workers from the villages nearby. A bus line and a natural spring park, that attracted many visitors in the region, which was demolished and removed, now the Roma neighbourhood .

References

External links
https://web.archive.org/web/20060103050226/http://www.straldja.net/

Towns in Bulgaria
Populated places in Yambol Province